Paulius Petrilevičius (born 23 March 1991) is a professional Lithuanian basketball player for Astoria Bydgoszcz of the Polish Basketball League (PLK).

Professional career 
Petrilevičius started his career in third-tier Regional Basketball League by signing with JAZZ-Diremta Birštonas.

On 10 July 2019, Petrilevičius signed with Pieno žvaigždės Pasvalys of the Lithuanian Basketball League (LKL). On 2 August 2021, he re-signed with the team for an additional season.

On 3 December 2022, Petrilevičius signed with Astoria Bydgoszcz of the Polish Basketball League (PLK).

References 

Living people
1991 births
BC Dzūkija players
BC Juventus players
BC Nevėžis players
BC Pieno žvaigždės players
Lithuanian men's basketball players
LSU-Atletas basketball players
Power forwards (basketball)
Sportspeople from Kėdainiai